Hameed Baloch was a Baloch student and member of the Baloch Students Organization (BSO). He was arrested on 9 December 1979, while he was a student at Government Degree College Turbat, on charges of firing at a military officer from the Gulf state of Oman. The Omani military officer was recruiting Pakistani Baloch soldiers from Balochistan province to suppress the Dhofar Rebellion. Oman at the time was facing a Marxist–Leninist insurgency in its Dhofar province. Ever since Oman first took control of the enclave of Gwadar in Balochistan in the 18th century it had hired foot soldiers from the region to serve in the Sultan of Oman's Armed Forces. Oman ceded sovereignty over Gwadar to Pakistan in 1958.

The BSO, being a leftist organization, was opposed to the recruitment, and to the fight against the Dhofar rebels, whose ideology had similarities with its own. They saw it as aiming to 'pervert' the youth in Baloch society against Marxist–Leninist teachings by offering huge salaries for their services in a mercenary army.

Hameed was tried by a special military court and condemned to death. The death sentence was carried out on 11 June 1981 in Mach prison.

See also
 Balochistan conflict
 Baloch Students Organization
 Allah Nazar Baloch
 Political prisoner

References

1958 births
1981 deaths
Baloch nationalists
Balochistan
Baloch Students Organization
People executed by Pakistan by hanging
History of Oman
Executed revolutionaries
Executed activists
Baloch people
Executed Pakistani people
20th-century executions by Pakistan